Air Charter Africa was a charter airline based in Banjul, Gambia established as Air Charter Express in 2007 and shortly renamed.

Fleet
The Air Charter Africa includes the following aircraft (as of 21 December 2008):  Has no own aircraft.

1 Boeing 737-200 (which is operated by Star Air Cargo)

See also		
 List of defunct airlines of the Gambia
 Transport in the Gambia

References

External links
 Air Charter Africa Fleet Details and History planespotters.net, accessdate 21 September 2020

Defunct airlines of the Gambia